Île Plate, also known as Flat Island, is a small island in the Indian Ocean off the north coast of Mauritius.

Geography

It is part of the administrative area of Rivière du Rempart District. The small nature reserve of Coin de Mire lies between the two islands.

As its name suggests, Île Plate is low-lying, apart from a bluff, and is in danger of possible submersion due to the historical rise in the sea-level. Two small islets, Îlot Gabriel and Pigeon Rock, lie close to the shore of Île Plate. The three sites are national protected areas (Pigeon Rock as part of Islets National Park).

Île Plate is uninhabited, though there is a small army base on the island.

Flora and fauna
A census conducted in 2007/2008 by the University of Mauritius classified 121 species of vascular plants, many of which are non-native. Among the indigenous plants present, the Latania loddigesii palm, Pandanus vandermeeschii (Pandanaceae), Psiadia arguta (Asteraceae), as well as the reintroduced Dracaena concinna (Agavaceae) and Aloe tormentorii ( Xanthorrhoeaceae), imported from the island of Coin de Mire.

The only mammals on the island are three species of bats: the Mascarene flying fox (Pteropus niger), the Mauritius tomb bat (Taphozous mauritianus) and the Mauritian molossian (Mormopterus acetabulosus).

Three species of seabirds nest on the island: the Pacific shearwater (Ardenna pacifica), the Red-tailed Phaethon (Phaethon Rubauda) and the White-tailed Phaethon (Phaethon lepturus). The rich vegetation of the interior of the island combined with the presence of wetlands also favor the nesting of the striated heron (Butorides striata) and occasionally also attract the small curlew (Numenius phaeopus), the plover (Pluvialis squatarola) and the stone turner (Arenaria interpres). Some exotic species such as the common maina (Acridotheres tristis), the red-mustache bulbul (Pycnonotus jocosus) and the European sparrow (Passer domesticus) are present.

The island was once home to the largest population of Bojer's skink (Gongylomorphus bojerii), once very common on the island of Mauritius, and now considered critically endangered. The population was decimated following the arrival of the musk shrew (Suncus murinus) on the island. Other reptiles present are the Bouton skink (Cryptoblepharus boutonii), the Mauritian felsuma (Phelsuma ornata) and the Coin de Mire night gecko (Nactus coindemirensis). Three exotic species have also been introduced to the island: the geckos Hemidactylus frenatus, Gehyra mutilata and the fossorial snake Indotyphlops braminus (Typhlopidae).

The black rat (R. rattus) population of Gabriel and Flat Island was eradicated in 1995 and 1998, respectively.

History
Île Plate was approached during the Baudin expedition to Australia on March 15, 1801. Jean-Baptiste Bory de Saint-Vincent described it from aboard the Naturaliste: she is "much lower than the others; a beach of limestone makes it remarkable from afar, and appears with a dazzling white hue; the rest of its rocks are reddish or black". To explain these last colors, he refers to a certain Lilet, an engineer officer, who would have visited the reef and who told him he had found the debris of an ancient crater of volcano.

One of Mauritius's few operating lighthouses, built in 1855, is found on the southwest side of the island.

Flat Island was used as a quarantine station from the mid-19th century to the 1930s. It was reserved for immigrants to Mauritius, mostly indentured labourers, undergoing quarantine for cholera, although it was sometimes used during other epidemic outbreaks such as smallpox and malaria. Infrastructure was built between 1856 and 1870 and included stone and wooden buildings. These buildings comprised living quarters and offices for medical, police, and immigration officials in charge of the quarantine station and barracks for migrants placed in quarantine. Kitchens, stores, toilets, privies, two hospitals, and a distillation plant used for water supply were also constructed. Many of these structures are still preserved, though overgrown.
A cemetery located on the southern side of the island is still recognizable for the presence of basalt structures and cairns on the top of some graves.

Archaeology
Since 2014, Project MACH (Mauritian Archaeology and Cultural Heritage) of Stanford University in the U.S. has been researching the heritage of Flat Island in collaboration with the Aapravasi Ghat Trust Fund and National Parks and Conservation Services of Mauritius.  The primary purpose of the project is to document the remaining structures of the quarantine station, and to perform the overall assessment of archaeological potential of the island. The results will form part of a wider restoration and conservation plan to promote the preservation of this important cultural site. The planned archaeological investigation includes detailed surveys of infrastructure, paths, and architectural features pertaining to the quarantine station as well as the cemetery. Over the years, four archaeological campaigns have been performed through intensive survey and execution of test-pits, in particular around the provision store building, one of the hospitals, and one of the camps that hosted the immigrants during quarantine. Also planned are a geophysical survey of subsoil features, an environmental sampling for geoarchaeological analysis, and a detailed mapping of the island through the use of a drone.

Tourism

Île Plate is a popular venue for snorkellers, and access to the island is possible via chartered yacht and catamaran. Pigeon Rock harbors an internationally famous dive site called The Shark Pit where divers can witness sharks swirling within the pit for the rich oxygen available due to the crushing waves against the cliffs of Pigeon Rock.

See also

 Islets of Mauritius

References

External links 

Islands of Mauritius
Quarantine facilities
Insular ecology
Flora of Mauritius
Biodiversity